The Queensland Railways C13 class locomotive was a class of 2-8-0 steam locomotives operated by the Queensland Railways.

History
In 1883, Dübs & Co delivered six 2-8-0 to the Queensland Railways. Per Queensland Railway's classification system they were designated the C13 class, C representing they had four driving axles, and the 13 the cylinder diameter in inches.

Four were delivered to the Maryborough Railway and two to the Bundaberg Railway. They late operated coal trains on the Redbank-Bundamba Loop Line.

Class list

References

Dübs locomotives
Railway locomotives introduced in 1883
C13
2-8-0 locomotives
3 ft 6 in gauge locomotives of Australia